The Star was a sailing event on the Sailing at the 1964 Summer Olympics program in Enoshima. Seven races were scheduled. 34 sailors, on 17 boats, from 17 nations competed.

Results

Daily standings

Conditions at Enoshima 
Of the total of three race areas were needed during the Olympics in Enoshima. Each of the classes was using the same scoring system. The Westerly course area was used for the Star.

Notes

References 
 
 
 
 

 

Star
Star (keelboat) competitions